The Plumbline is a humor publication of the  (MES) of McMaster University. Popular among the students of McMaster Engineering, The Plumbline is famous for publishing everything from obscene sexual innuendos to informative articles. The Plumbline was started by a group of Engineering students in 1967, developed from a single sheet MES news letter. In 1971, the editors decided to turn the newsletter into an 8-page tabloid format newspaper.

By the early 1990s, it was clear that student and administration acceptance of sexist and xenophobic content was reduced. In this climate, The Plumbline reformatted, dropping the drooping penis from its masthead, developing the satirical and parody genres of humor and abandoning misogyny as fodder for comedy.

In October 2012, The Plumbline converted to a digital format, due to declining readerships and large print costs.

Some in the McMaster Engineering community feel that the Plumbline is unfairly targeted by the remainder of the campus for its controversial content and potentially offensive subject matter, and that it is subjected to a harsher, more restrictive standard than other on-campus events (such as the misogynistic lyrics of Choclair who performed on campus) and publications organized by other groups (like the campus wide newspaper The Silhouette).

Although The Plumbline is a publication of the MES, the material contained within it is not in any way affiliated with McMaster University, and does not express views or opinions shared by all, if any, students at the University.

Origins

Larry Ireland was the first editor-in-chief of The Plumbline (section), which got its name in an MES contest in the spring of 1967. Previously the MES newsletter was a one-page bi-monthly publication, which became the first Plumbline issue in April 1967 (volume 4 Nos 1 to 12). Don Mros created the cartoon character of Superplumber, who battled 'artsies' and other 'low-lifes'.

With help of Dean Hodgins office staff, the Plumbline put out a 4-page bi-weekly paper, which started with circulation of roughly 400 copies but grew to more than a thousand (total enrolment in all years & grads of Engineering = less than 700). The Plumbline became the most widely read newsletter on campus, especially in the women's residences. Limited by the technology of the day, the first issues used mimeograph and gestetner printing.

Content

Engitorials: Similar to a regular editorial, written by the Plumbline editors.
Shines and Moon: A thumbs up, thumbs down section where events and/or people are given approval or disapproval.
Shindigs and Hoedowns: A report or review of current events within the Engineering Society.
Onions and Opinions: A section similar to regular newspapers where readers can submit opinions and complaints.
News Briefs: Humorous news clips, most often fictional and absurd.
Nuts and Bolt: Various games and activities such as crosswords and connect-the-dots.
Plumboscopes: A humorous horoscope written by a Plumbline 'astrologer'.
Arts Matter: A section devoted to numerous comic strips, including those drawn by contributors.
Shafts and Gears: Page containing 'nerdy' or 'sick' jokes, usually inappropriate and/or technically obscure.

The Plumbline also contains featured articles, usually pertaining to current events around McMaster and Engineering, as well as pictures and clips submitted by readers. The Plumbline is heavily dependent on reader-submitted content.

Controversy

In late 2005, publication of The Plumbline was temporarily suspended because of allegations from the McMaster Coalition for Equitable Social Change that the paper promoted hate-speech and sexist attitudes. The Coalition saw the newspaper as a key element in a larger problem of intolerance within the faculty of Engineering. They argued that this is evident in many of the faculty's traditions and "welcome" practices for first year students. According to them, the newspaper legitimized this culture of intolerance. On the other hand, advocates of The Plumbline argued that the depictions were wholly satirical in nature and protected under free speech. Some argue that the opposition was a form of moral panic in response to the rape of a McMaster student within the Engineering faculty and the efforts to minimize the rape and subsequent conviction of Engineering student for the crime.

After a brief period of debates and arguments including review by the Executive of the McMaster Engineering Society, the Dean of Engineering, and the Human Rights Office, The Plumbline returned to shelves. There were a number of changes suggested to the content and a series of sensitivity training sessions took effect. Currently both online and hard-copy versions of the newspaper are available.

Current status
Volume 53
Review board of 11 engineering students, including the Publications chair and Editorial Review Committee

Recent Editors
2022-2023: Ayesha Basu and Miguel Sibal
2021-2022: Emilia Nietresta, Emily Nobes, and Zach Thorne
2020-2021: Alexi Buenaventura & Angela Huang 
2018-2019: MJ Lindsay and Jackson Tarlin
2017-2018: Vicky Duarte and Andy Fan
2016-2017: Pooja Srikanth and Max Guan
2015-2016: Tyson Collins and Neil MacPhee
2014-2015: Marko Maric and Neil MacPhee
2013-2014: Steph Elder, Martin Bellamy
2012-2013: Zachary Strong
2011-2012: Zachary Strong, Jaime Maitland
2010-2011: Justin Panus, Danielle Maitland
2009 November - 2010: Danielle Maitland, Justin Panus, Niel Van Engelen
2009 April - October: Allan Kean
2008-2009: Justin Sma, Jon Huber
2008 January - March: Josh Campbell, Justin Sma
2007 April - December: Josh Campbell, Kevin Tanaka
2006-2007: James Spackman, James Morris 
2005-2006: Ashkan Eshaghbeigi, Mike Everson
2004-2005: Emery Finkelstein, Cam Farrell 
2004: Jackson Wiegman, Andrew Tataj (two issues)
2003-2004: Peter Kostanski, Andrew Tataj
2002-2003: Matthew Bigness, Chris Ness
2001-2002: Andrew Hill
2000-2001: Cam Hodgkins
1999-2000: Cam Hodgkins
1998-1999: Duncan Forster

References

External links
  Engineering side of the 2006 Controversy
  Opposition side of the 2006 Controversy
  MES Plumbline Archives under password protection

College humor magazines
Magazines established in 1967
McMaster University
Magazines published in Ontario
Student magazines published in Canada
1967 establishments in Ontario